Chase C. Shugart (born October 24, 1996) is an American professional baseball pitcher in the Boston Red Sox organization.

Amateur career
Shugart attended Bridge City High School in Bridge City, Texas, where he played football and baseball. As a junior in 2014 he compiled a 10–1 record and a 1.64 ERA with 127 strikeouts in  innings pitched, and in 2015, as a senior, he was 10–2 with a 0.67 ERA along with batting .544 with nine home runs and 27 RBIs. Shugart was not drafted out of high school in the 2015 MLB draft, and he enrolled at the University of Texas to play college baseball for the Texas Longhorns.

As a freshman at Texas in 2016, Shugart made 32 appearances, all in relief, and pitched to a 2–3 record and 4.53 ERA. In 2017, as a sophomore, he was 3–2 with a 3.43 ERA and 1.45 WHIP in 42 innings pitched out of the bullpen. After the season, he pitched for the Cotuit Kettleers of the Cape Cod Baseball League. Shugart transitioned from a reliever to a starting pitcher as a junior in 2018. He pitched for Texas in the 2018 College World Series until the Longhorns were eliminated by the Florida Gators on June 19. He finished his junior year with a 5–3 record and a 4.36 ERA in  innings pitched.

Professional career
On June 6, 2018, Shugart was selected in the 12th round of the 2018 Major League Baseball draft, with the 370th overall pick, by the Boston Red Sox. On June 22, Shugart announced via Twitter that he would forego his final year at Texas in order to sign with the Red Sox. He  signed with Boston on July 6, and first pitched in mid-August for the Rookie-level Gulf Coast League Red Sox, where he made three appearances with a 1.80 ERA in five innings of work. In late August, he was assigned to the Lowell Spinners of the Class A Short Season New York-Penn League, with whom he made one scoreless appearance.

On March 22, 2019, Major League Baseball suspended Shugart for fifty games "after a second positive test violating the drug prevention and treatment program." Shugart subsequently made his first appearance of the 2019 season on May 27 with the Greenville Drive of the Class A South Atlantic League, spending the remainder of the year there. Over 16 starts, Shugart went 6–4 with a 2.81 ERA, striking out 73 over  innings. After the 2020 minor league season was cancelled due to the COVID-19 pandemic, Shugart was invited to participate in the Red Sox' fall instructional league. For the 2021 season, Shugart returned to Greenville, now members of the High-A East, started 22 games and pitched to a 6-6 record, a 4.78 ERA, and 93 strikeouts over  innings. He opened the 2022 season with the Portland Sea Dogs of the Double-A Eastern League and moved into the bullpen. In early July, he was promoted to the Worcester Red Sox of the Triple-A International League. On August 4, he pitched two innings of a combined no-hitter alongside Michael Wacha and AJ Politi versus the Durham Bulls. Over 45 games (one start) between the two teams, Shugart went 5-5 with a 5.31 ERA and 63 strikeouts over  innings.

References

External links

SoxProspects.com
Texas Longhorns bio

1996 births
Living people
American sportspeople in doping cases
Baseball players from Texas
Sportspeople from Texas
Baseball pitchers
Texas Longhorns baseball players
Gulf Coast Red Sox players
Lowell Spinners players
Greenville Drive players
Cotuit Kettleers players
Baseball players suspended for drug offenses
Portland Sea Dogs players
Worcester Red Sox players